Kamiar Ghanbari (born 1988 in Tehran) is an Iranian football defender who currently plays for Persepolis F.C. in Iran's Premier Football League. He is a talented left footed defender who can play in the left back and central defender position. He has represented Iran in most youth levels. He left the PAS Tehran F.C. youth system at the beginning of 2007 at the age of 19 after being approved by Hamid Estili he put pen to paper to a contract keeping him at Persepolis until 2010.

Honours

Iran's Premier Football League Winner: 1
2007/08 with Persepolis

References 

Iranian footballers
People from Tehran
Persepolis F.C. players
1988 births
Living people
Date of birth missing (living people)
Association football defenders